Yekaterina Mikhaylovna Sharmina (née Martynova; ; born August 6, 1986, in Bryansk) is a Russian runner who specializes in the middle-distance events.

She is coached by Svetlana Pleskach-Styrkina, who also coaches Yekaterina Kostetskaya.

Doping 
In November 2016, after athlete biological passport (ABP) analysis indicated blood doping, the Court of Arbitration for Sport decided to void Sharmina's results between June 17, 2011, and August 5, 2015, and to ban her from competition for three years, beginning on December 7, 2015. As a result, she will be stripped of her 1,500m Universiade title from Kazan.

Achievements

References

External links 

Rus Athletics profile

1986 births
Living people
Sportspeople from Bryansk
Russian female middle-distance runners
Athletes (track and field) at the 2012 Summer Olympics
Olympic athletes of Russia
Russian sportspeople in doping cases
World Athletics indoor record holders (relay)